Honor Thy Father is a 1971 book by Gay Talese, and a 1973 American TV film adaptation.

Honor Thy Father may also refer to:

 "Honour thy father and thy mother", one of the Biblical Ten Commandments
 Honor Thy Father (film), a 2015 Filipino crime drama
 "Honor Thy Father" (Arrow) a 2012 television episode
 "Honor Thy Father" (Queen of Swords) a 2000 television episode
 "Honor Thy Father", a 2003 song by Dream Theater from Train of Thought

See also
 "Honor Thy Fathers", a 2017 episode of Arrow
 Honor Thy Mother (disambiguation)